The Pioneer programs were two series of United States lunar and planetary space probes exploration. The first program, which ran from 1958 to 1960, unsuccessfully attempted to send spacecraft to orbit the Moon, successfully sent one spacecraft to fly by the Moon, and successfully sent one spacecraft to investigate interplanetary space between the orbits of Earth and Venus. The second program, which ran from 1965 to 1992, sent four spacecraft to measure interplanetary space weather, two to explore Jupiter and Saturn, and two to explore Venus. The two outer planet probes, Pioneer 10 and Pioneer 11, became the first two of five artificial objects to achieve the escape velocity that will allow them to leave the Solar System, and carried a golden plaque each depicting a man and a woman and information about the origin and the creators of the probes, in case any extraterrestrials find them someday.

Naming
Credit for naming the first probe has been attributed to Stephen A. Saliga, who had been assigned to the Air Force Orientation Group, Wright-Patterson AFB, as chief designer of Air Force exhibits. While he was at a briefing, the spacecraft was described to him, as, a "lunar-orbiting vehicle, with an infrared scanning device." Saliga thought the title too long, and lacked theme for an exhibit design. He suggested, "Pioneer", as the name of the probe, since "the Army had already launched and orbited the Explorer satellite, and their Public Information Office was identifying the Army, as, 'Pioneers in Space,'" and, by adopting the name, the Air Force would "make a 'quantum jump' as to who, really, [were] the 'Pioneers' in space.'"

Early missions 

The earliest missions were attempts to achieve Earth's escape velocity, simply to show it was feasible and to study the Moon. This included the first launch by NASA which was formed from the old NACA. These missions were carried out by the Air Force Ballistic Missile Division, Army, and NASA.

Able space probes (1958–1960) 

Most missions here are listed with their most recognised name, and alternate names in italic.

Pioneer 0 
Thor-Able 1, Pioneer 
Lunar orbiter
Destroyed 
Thor failure 77 seconds after launch.
August 17, 1958
Pioneer 1 
Thor-Able 2, Pioneer I
Lunar orbiter, missed Moon 
Third stage partial failure.
Pioneer 2 
Thor-Able 3, Pioneer II
Lunar orbiter, reentry 
Third stage failure.
November 8, 1958
Pioneer P-1 
Atlas-Able 4A, Pioneer W
Launch vehicle lost. 
September 24, 1959
Pioneer P-3 
Atlas-Able 4, Atlas-Able 4B, Pioneer X

Pioneer 5 
Pioneer P-2, Thor-Able 4, Pioneer V

Pioneer P-30 
Atlas-Able 5A, Pioneer Y
Lunar probe
Failed to achieve lunar orbit.
September 25, 1960
Pioneer P-31 
Atlas-Able 5B, Pioneer Z
Lunar probe
Lost in upper stage failure. 
December 15, 1960

Juno II lunar probes (1958–1959) 
 Pioneer 3  – Lunar flyby, missed Moon due to launcher failure December 6, 1958
 Pioneer 4  – Lunar flyby, achieved Earth escape velocity, launched March 3, 1959

Later missions (1965–1978) 

Five years after the early Able space probe missions ended, NASA Ames Research Center used the Pioneer name for a new series of missions, initially aimed at the inner Solar System, before the flyby missions to Jupiter and Saturn. While successful, the missions returned much poorer images than the Voyager program probes would five years later. In 1978, the end of the program saw a return to the inner Solar System, with the Pioneer Venus Orbiter and Multiprobe, this time using orbital insertion rather than flyby missions.

The new missions were numbered beginning with Pioneer 6 (alternate names in parentheses).

Interplanetary weather 
The spacecraft in Pioneer missions 6, 7, 8, and 9 comprised a new interplanetary space weather network:
 Pioneer 6 (Pioneer A) – launched December 1965
 Pioneer 7 (Pioneer B) – launched August 1966
 Pioneer 8 (Pioneer C) – launched December 1967
 Pioneer 9 (Pioneer D) – launched November 1968 (inactive since 1983)
 Pioneer E – lost in launcher failure August 1969
Pioneer 6 and Pioneer 9 are in solar orbits with 0.8 AU distance to the Sun. Their orbital periods are therefore slightly shorter than Earth's. Pioneer 7 and Pioneer 8 are in solar orbits with 1.1 AU distance to the Sun. Their orbital periods are therefore slightly longer than Earth's. Since the probes' orbital periods differ from that of the Earth, from time to time, they face a side of the Sun that cannot be seen from Earth. The probes can sense parts of the Sun several days before the Sun's rotation reveals it to ground-based Earth orbiting observatories.

Outer Solar System missions 

 Pioneer 10 (Pioneer F) –  Jupiter, interstellar medium, launched March 1972
 Pioneer 11 (Pioneer G) –  Jupiter, Saturn, interstellar medium, launched April 1973
 Pioneer H  – proposed out-of-ecliptic mission for 1974, never launched. Is identical to Pioneers 10 and 11.

Venus project 

 Pioneer Venus Orbiter (Pioneer Venus 1, Pioneer 12) – launched May 1978
 Pioneer Venus Multiprobe (Pioneer Venus 2, Pioneer 13) – launched August 1978
 Pioneer Venus Probe Bus – transport vehicle and upper atmosphere probe
 Pioneer Venus Large Probe – 300 kg parachuted probe
 Pioneer Venus North Probe – 75 kg impactor probe
 Pioneer Venus Night Probe – 75 kg impactor probe
 Pioneer Venus Day Probe – 75 kg impactor probe

See also 
 Mariner program
 Pioneer anomaly
 Ranger program
 Surveyor program
 Timeline of Solar System exploration
 Voyager program

References

External links 

 Pioneer (Moon) Program Page by NASA's Solar System Exploration
 Mark Wolverton's The Depths of Space online
 Thor Able – Encyclopedia Astronautica
 Space Technology Laboratories Documents Archive
 WebGL-based 3D artist's view of Pioneer @ SPACECRAFTS 3D

 
1958 in spaceflight
NASA programs